Dennis Novak (born 28 August 1993, in Wiener Neustadt) is an Austrian professional tennis player. Novak achieved a career-high ATP singles ranking of world No. 85 in March 2020.

Professional career

2013
Novak made his ATP main draw debut at the 2013 Bet-at-home Cup Kitzbühel where he defeated Matthias Haim, Lorenzo Giustino and Tihomir Grozdanov in the qualifying rounds. In the main draw, Novak lost to compatriot Andreas Haider-Maurer.

2018: Grand Slam debut, Wimbledon third round

2019: Two Challenger titles
In April, he won his first ATP Challenger Tour title in Taipei. In November, he won his second at the 2019 Slovak Open.

2020: Top 100 debut
He made his debut in the top 100 on 13 January 2020 at world No. 99 and reached a career high ranking of No. 85 on 2 March 2020.

2022: Wimbledon second round, Austrian No.1
He became Austrian No. 1 on 15 August 2022.

Performance timelines

Singles
Current through the 2022 Davis Cup.

Doubles

ATP career finals

Doubles: 1 (1 runner-up)

ATP Challenger and ITF Futures finals

Singles: 39 (26–13)

Doubles: 10 (4–6)

Record against top 10 players 
Novak's match record against those who have been ranked in the Top 10, with those who have been No. 1 in boldface.

  Hubert Hurkacz: 1–0
  Lucas Pouille: 1–0
  Andrey Rublev: 1–0
  Gilles Simon: 1–0
  Fabio Fognini: 1–1
  Kevin Anderson: 0–1
  Marin Čilić: 0–1
  Grigor Dimitrov: 0–1
  Novak Djokovic: 0–1
  Richard Gasquet: 0–1
  Gaël Monfils: 0–1
  Milos Raonic: 0–1
  Casper Ruud: 0–1
  Jannik Sinner: 0–1
  Radek Štěpánek: 0–1
  Alexander Zverev: 0–1
  Karen Khachanov: 0–2

References

External links

1993 births
Living people
Austrian male tennis players
Sportspeople from Wiener Neustadt
People from Baden District, Austria
21st-century Austrian people